A gnome is a diminutive spirit in Renaissance magic and alchemy.

Gnome or GNOME may also refer to:

Computing
 GNOME, a desktop environment for computers running Unix-like operating systems
 GNO/ME (GNO Multitasking Environment), an environment for the Apple IIGS computer
 Gnome sort, a sorting algorithm

Fictional races
 Gnome (Dungeons & Dragons), a race in the Dungeons & Dragons role-playing game
 Gnome (Dragonlance)
 Gnomes (Warcraft), a race in World of Warcraft

Film and television
 Gnomes (film), a 1980 film based on the 1977 book
 "Gnomes" (South Park), a 1998 episode of South Park
 Gnomes, characters in Gravity Falls

Literature
 "The Gnome" (fairy tale), a German fairy tale collected by the Brothers Grimm
 Gnomes (book), a 1977 book by Wil Huygen and illustrated by Rien Poortvliet
 Lord Gnome, the fictional proprietor of the British satirical magazine Private Eye
 Gnome, a villain appearing in the Marvel Comics series Nightmask

Other uses
 Gnome (rhetoric), saying or maxim providing instruction in compact form
 Gnome (car), a cyclecar made in London between 1925 and 1926
 "The Gnome", a song by Pink Floyd
 G-Nome, a video game released in 1997
 Gnome Press, a 1948–1962 small-press publishing company 
 Garden gnome, a figurine used as a lawn ornament
 Project Gnome, a nuclear test in 1961
 Rolls-Royce Gnome, an aircraft engine
 Sky Gnome, a device for accessing radio channels and digital television
 Ramón Mercader (1913–1978), a foreign agent of the USSR codenamed GNOME

See also
 Big Ears (character), a gnome featured in the Noddy series of children's books by Enid Blyton
 Gnome et Rhône, a defunct aircraft engine manufacturer
 A Gnome Named Gnorm, a 1990 fantasy comedy film
 Gnomes of Zurich, disparaging term for Swiss bankers notably used by British Prime Minister Harold Wilson in 1964
 "The Laughing Gnome", a novelty song by David Bowie
 Noldor, one of the tribes of elves in J. R. R. Tolkien's fictional Middle-earth
 Nome (disambiguation)
 Gnomefish